Svedka is a mid-priced brand of vodka owned by New York-based Constellation Brands. The product name is a portmanteau of the words Sverige or Svenska ("Sweden" and "Swedish" respectively in the Swedish language) and "vodka". The spirit is unaged 40% alcohol (80 proof). Svedka is bottled unflavored, and in citron, cherry, clementine, raspberry, vanilla, blue raspberry, and piña colada flavors.

Svedka vodka originates from a small brewery in Lidköping, Sweden. For many Swedes it is unknown though.

Svedka was acquired by Constellation Brands in March 2007 for US$384 million.

They made some "spooky internet advertisements" for Halloween in 2017. This led to many customers feeling uneasy and was ultimately an unsuccessful marketing campaign.

Svedka Vodka was in 2008 described as "fast growing", as it added a new flavor, "Citron", Swedish for lemon.

The Swedish National Food Agency claims that it may not be distributed as Swedish vodka because "Swedish vodka" is a protected designation according to EU rules, and thus must meet certain requirements. The Swedish National Food Agency believes that Lantmännen violates some of these requirements when the company transports the concentrated 96 percent alcohol to the United States to be diluted with water there.

References

External links
 

Swedish vodkas